Wallace Arthur (born 30 March 1952) is an evolutionary biologist and science writer. He is Emeritus Professor of Zoology at the University of Galway. His most recent book is Understanding Life in the Universe, published by Cambridge University Press, which focuses on the likely extent (how many planets?) and nature (how much like us?) of extraterrestrial life. He was one of the founding editors of the journal Evolution & Development, serving as an editor for nearly 20 years. He has held visiting positions at Harvard University, Darwin College Cambridge, and the University of Warmia and Mazury in Olsztyn, Poland.

Early life and education
Wallace Arthur was born in Belfast, Northern Ireland, in 1952. He attended Friends School Lisburn and Campbell College Belfast. He received a BSc in biology from the University of Ulster in 1973 and a PhD in evolutionary biology from the University of Nottingham in 1977.

Scientific work

Arthur describes himself as "a bit of a maverick" who likes "making connections across disciplinary boundaries". His early work was at the interface between evolution and ecology, his later work at the interface between evolution and development, or ‘evo-devo’. His main contributions have been on the origin of animal body plans, the role of developmental bias in evolution, and the evolution of arthropod segmentation. His most recent book explores the interface between biology and astronomy, with two key themes: the likelihood of life having evolved on multiple exoplanets, and the nature of that life being probably not too different to life on Earth.

Arthur is a proponent of a more comprehensive evolutionary synthesis that takes into account progress in the field of evo-devo.

Books 
 Mechanisms of Morphological Evolution: 1984, Wiley
 Theories of Life: Darwin, Mendel and Beyond: 1987, Penguin
 The Niche in Competition and Evolution: 1987, Wiley
 A Theory of the Evolution of Development: 1988, Wiley
 The Green Machine: Ecology and the Balance of Nature: 1990, Blackwell
 The Origin of Animal Body Plans: 1997, Cambridge University Press
 Biased Embryos and Evolution: 2004, Cambridge University Press
 Creatures of Accident: The Rise of the Animal Kingdom: 2006, Hill & Wang (Farrar, Straus & Giroux)
 Evolution: A Developmental Approach: 2011, Wiley-Blackwell
 Evolving Animals: 2014, Cambridge University Press
 Life through Time and Space: 2017, Harvard University Press
 The Biological Universe: Life in the Milky Way and Beyond: 2020, Cambridge University Press
 Understanding Evo-Devo: 2021, Cambridge University Press
 Understanding Life in the Universe: 2023, Cambridge University Press

Notes

External links 
Staff page at NUI Galway

1952 births
Living people
20th-century Irish scientists
21st-century Irish scientists
Evolutionary biologists
Extended evolutionary synthesis
Irish geneticists
People educated at Friends' School, Lisburn
Scientists from Belfast